Henin or Hénin is a French surname.

People
 The House of Hénin, a family of Belgian high nobility
 Charles-Alexandre de Hénin-Liétard d'Alsace
 Maximilien de Hénin-Liétard
 Thomas Philip Wallrad de Hénin-Liétard d'Alsace
 Étienne Félix d'Henin de Cuvillers, French mesmerism expert
 Jacky Hénin
 Jérémy Hénin
 Justine Henin, Belgian retired professional tennis player
 Nicolas Hénin, French journalist, Middle East specialist
 Roland Henin
 Valérie Hénin

Places
 Hénin-Beaumont, Pas-de-Calais department, France
 Hénin-sur-Cojeul, Pas-de-Calais department, France
 Henin, Poland

See also
 11948 Justinehénin, a Themistian asteroid
 Hennin, medieval ladies' hats

French-language surnames